Victoria station may refer to:

Railway and tram stations

Operational 
 London Victoria station, in England
 Llandudno Victoria tram stop, in Wales
 Manchester Victoria station, in England
 Southend Victoria railway station, in England
 Square-Victoria–OACI station, in Montreal, Canada
 Victoria metro station, Athens, in Greece
 Victoria metro station, Kolkata, in India
 Chhatrapati Shivaji Terminus, formerly Victoria Terminus, in Mumbai, India

Closed 
 Norwich Victoria railway station, in England
 Nottingham Victoria railway station, in England
 Sheffield Victoria railway station, in England
 Swansea Victoria railway station, in Wales
 Victoria railway station (Ireland), in County Cork
 Victoria (Blaenau Gwent) railway station, in Wales
 Victoria Dock railway station, also known as Victoria station, in Hull, England
 Victoria Station (British Columbia), in Victoria, Canada

Other uses 
 Victoria Coach Station, in London, England
 Victoria bus station, in London, England
 Nottingham Victoria bus station, in England
 Victoria Station (restaurant), a restaurant chain
 Victoria Station (play), by Harold Pinter

See also
 Victoria Street Station (disambiguation)